Renata Zachová (born 31 May 2000) is a Czech judoka.

She is the bronze medallist of the 2020 Judo Grand Prix Tel Aviv.

She won one of the bronze medals in her event at the 2022 Judo Grand Prix Almada held in Almada, Portugal.

References

External links
 

2000 births
Living people
Czech female judoka
21st-century Czech women